Matsya Nyaya (IAST: mātsyanyāya) is an ancient Indian philosophy which refers to the principle of the Law of Fish. It is described as the fundamental law of nature explained by the proverb of the big fish devouring the smaller fish, hence strong devour the weak. It can be equated to the 'Law of the Jungle'. In simple words, The strong dominates over the weak when there is disorder.

Philosophy 
The ancient Indian philosopher Chanakya (Kautilya), who was also the chief advisor of the Mauryan emperor Chandragupta Maurya, used this theory in his treatise Arthashastra to describe why a state should enhance its size and security. According to Chanakya, in absence of government or rule of law, the human society will degenerate into a state of anarchy in which the strong will destroy or exploit the weak much like how bigger fish eat smaller fish. So according to this philosophy, the theory of government was based on a belief in the innate depravity of man. In other words, this theory proposes that government, rulers and laws are necessary to prevent this natural law of 'Matsya Nyaya' from operating in human society. Hence this explains why there is a need for a government and laws to be in place. Hence, Kautilya stresses the importance of 'danda' (strong authority), as its absence will lead to the law of fishes, i.e, anarchy.

Verses in Arthashastra

References

Bibliography
 King, Governance, and Law in Ancient India: Kauṭilya's Arthaśāstra, translated and annotated by Patrick Olivelle, Oxford University Press, 2013
 , especially Book Six: Circle of Kings as the Basis, pp. 305–312

External links
 Kautilya Arthashastra English translation by R. Shamasastry 1956 (revised edition with IAST diacritics and interwoven glossary)
Arthashastra (English) (Another archive of 1915 R Shamasastry translation)

Ancient Indian literature
Political theories